Oliver Lawrence (by 1507 – 1559), of Poole and Creech St Michael, Dorset, London and Soberton, Hampshire, was an English Member of Parliament.

He was a Member (MP) of the Parliament of England for Melcombe Regis in 1529, Poole (UK Parliament constituency) in 1542 and 1545 and for Dorset (UK Parliament constituency) in 1558.

References

1559 deaths
16th-century English people
People of the Tudor period
People from Poole
Members of the Parliament of England (pre-1707)
Politicians from Dorset
People from London
People from the City of Winchester
Year of birth uncertain
People from Somerset East